Craig Michael Wheeler is a Democratic former member of the New Hampshire House of Representatives, representing the Nashua 29th district in 1995 and 1996.  He was elected for one term in 1994, with 462 votes, coming in third.  He served on the Environment & Agriculture and State-Federal Relations committees.

References

Democratic Party members of the New Hampshire House of Representatives
Living people
Year of birth missing (living people)
Politicians from Nashua, New Hampshire